Ogimachi Station (扇町駅) is the name of two train stations in Japan:

Ōgimachi Station (Kanagawa)
 Ōgimachi Station (Osaka)